Ralph Bates (12 February 1940 – 27 March 1991) was an English film and television actor, known for his role in the British sitcom Dear John and the original Poldark.

Biography

Bates was born in Bristol, England. His parents were both psychiatrists; his mother was French and he was a great-great-grandson of French scientist Louis Pasteur. He held dual-nationality and was bilingual, and was educated at Trinity College Dublin. He read French there, before winning a scholarship to Yale Drama School. The course completed, Bates returned to Ireland to make his stage debut in Shaw's You Never Can Tell at The Gate Theatre, Dublin, in 1963. A career in repertory theatre followed, and the young actor gained experience in productions ranging from Hedda Gabler to raucous comedies.

Later, Bates carved a niche in the world of horror films and played important roles or the lead in several Hammer Horror productions, such as Taste the Blood of Dracula, The Horror of Frankenstein, Lust for a Vampire, and Dr. Jekyll and Sister Hyde, in which he played a doctor who mistakenly transforms himself into a beautiful siren.

He portrayed Caligula in the series The Caesars and with Cyd Hayman in the Crime of Passion series. After playing Thomas Culpeper in an episode of The Six Wives of Henry VIII (1970), he starred in the series Moonbase 3 (1973) and Poldark, in which he played villainous George Warleggan. The series ran for 29 episodes, starting in 1975. He also played communist Paul Vercors in the final season of the drama series Secret Army. Because of his French ancestry and dark looks, he often was chosen to play a Frenchman on television, such as in an episode of ITV comedy drama Turtle's Progress. Bates also appeared in the television movie Minder on the Orient Express, again as a Frenchman.

It looked, for some time, as if he might remain typecast in sinister roles, but he was offered a part in a comedy series by the writer John Sullivan, which saw Bates cast in a more sympathetic role as the newly divorced member of a singles group. Dear John (1986–87) ran for two series, and gave him chance to display a talent for comic roles. Around the same time, he appeared in the sitcom Farrington of the F.O. (1986) with Angela Thorne and Joan Sims.

Private life
Bates was divorced from the actress Joanna Van Gyseghem, and survived by his second wife, actress Virginia Wetherell (married 1973–1991). The couple had a son and a daughter.

Death
Bates was diagnosed with pancreatic cancer and died from the disease in London, aged 51. The large metal cross marking his grave at Chiswick New Cemetery bears the epitaph "Don't Worry. Be_Happy!"

The Ralph Bates Pancreatic Cancer Research Fund is a registered charity.

Filmography

References

External links
 
 
 Photos of Ralph Bates' grave at Findagrave

1940 births
1991 deaths
Alumni of Trinity College Dublin
Deaths from cancer in England
Deaths from pancreatic cancer
English male film actors
English male television actors
Male actors from Bristol
Yale School of Drama alumni
20th-century English male actors